Sub City Records is a record label which was created by Louis Posen and Hopeless Records to raise funding and awareness for non-profit organizations. Sub City has been active since 1999, and has now over 30 releases.

The label has donated over $2 million to more than 50 nonprofit organizations. Proceeds are generated by Sub City's releases and the label's annual Take Action Tour.

Artists
 Against All Authority
 Kaddisfly
 Mike Park

Former Artists 

 Fifteen/Jeff Ott
 Funeral Oration
 Mêlée (Moved to Warner Bros. Records)
 Scared of Chaka
 Thrice
 The Weakerthans

See also 
 List of record labels

References

External links
Official site

Record labels established in 2002
American independent record labels
Ska record labels
Punk record labels
2002 establishments in the United States